George Carr Round (September 14, 1839 – November 5, 1918) was a Union soldier (and later officer) who settled in Prince William County, Virginia, after the American Civil War, where he became a lawyer, superintendent of public instruction in Manassas, Virginia, and served a term in the Virginia General Assembly. Although Round donated the land for a more-accessible courthouse, organized the first public schools in the area and secured funding for the county's first public library, he became known nationally in his lifetime for organizing the Manassas Peace Jubilee in 1911, alongside fellow one-term delegate Edmund Berkeley (a former Confederate officer) and for contributing to the creation of Manassas National Battlefield Park decades after his death.

Early and family life

Born at Kingston, Pennsylvania, to former schoolteacher Sarah Ann Carr and her husband, Methodist minister William Round. His grandfather, Bartram Round, has served as a lieutenant of Connecticut troops in the American Revolutionary War known as the "Scituate Hunters", and Round could trace his ancestry to colonists emigrating on the Mayflower. His birth family included an elder half-sister, Sarah Mehetabel Round , brother Rev. John E. Round and a sister Lydia Adelia Round Pine. The senior Rev. Round accepted positions at several churches in Pennsylvania and New York, but George Round grew up in Windsor, New York (on the Pennsylvania border), and attended the Windsor Academy, a collegiate preparatory school. In 1858 he began studies at Wesleyan University in Middletown, Connecticut, but interrupted them in his junior year in order to enlist in the First Connecticut Volunteers. Round resumed them after the war, became a member of Alpha Delta Phi and Phi Beta Kappa, and graduated in 1865.

Round then enrolled at Columbia Law School, and was admitted to the New York bar in 1868. He spent about a year with a New York firm before moving southward (expecting to visit relatives in North Carolina) and settling in Virginia as discussed below.

He married Emily Bennett in Manassas in 1877. Although she was born in London, Ontario, and likewise moved to Manassas (with her parents Charles and Cathering Maitland Bennett) in 1869, Emily Round became respected for helping found the town's Bethlehem Club, serving as president of its Woman's Christian Temperance Union chapter, work with Trinity Episcopal Church, and would become the town's oldest citizen by the time of her death. Three daughters and two sons would survive infancy—Norma Round Davies (1878–1981), Ruth Althea Round Hoof, Lt. Roswell Emory Round, Emily Round Lewis, and George Charles Round. Their son and William Maitland Round died as infants in the 1880s.

American Civil War

As the Civil War began, Round interrupted his studies (which included voluntary military drills) to enlist in the First Connecticut Artillery, although he later noted that the favorite uncle after whom he had been named had long been a teacher in Georgia and the Carolinas and his boys had volunteered for Confederate service much as George Round and his brother had volunteered for the Union Army. After three years Round transferred to the U.S. Army Signal Corps and received a commission as lieutenant.

He spent most of his service in North Carolina. Round later described how he sent the last signal of the war, climbing the dome of the North Carolina state capital at Raleigh pursuant to orders of General William T. Sherman to establish a signal station (that had caused local consternation when he used black flags to note President Lincoln's assassination). He used colorful signal rockets to transmit the message "On earth peace, good will toward men" upon hearing confirmation of the war's end.

After the war Round became involved in veterans activities, eventually becoming president of the U.S. Signal Corps Association. His elder brother Rev. John Emory Round, enlisted as a Captain in Company K of the 43rd Massachusetts Infantry and served nearly a year before being mustered out on July 30, 1863.

Career
Round appreciated the Southern hospitality he had received despite being a Northern soldier, and wanted to help rebuild after the war's devastation. He moved to Virginia and opened a law and real estate office in Manassas on New Year's day, 1869. He was soon nominated as Prince William County's commonwealth's attorney (prosecutor) by the military government. In 1870, Round ran for the office in 1870, but lost to James F. Clark, who resigned circa 1872, and was succeeded by Charles E. Sinclair (who had served in both houses of the Virginia General Assembly and would become a judge). Round helped rebuild Manassas, whose good railroad connections had led to the important First Battle of Bull Run (a.k.a. First Manassas) in July 1862 and Second Battle of Bull Run (a.k.a. Second Manassas) the following year, but its population had shrunk by half by the time Round arrived.

Virginia was on the verge of adopting a new state Constitution (proposed by the Virginia Constitutional Convention of 1868) which not only abolished slavery, but also established the state's first public school system (although funding would become a recurrent issue). By the close of 1869, Round established the county's first public school (for white children) in the rear room of the Asbury Methodist Episcopal Church (with Miss Estelle Green as teacher). It expanded to a second room the following year as the new school board (with Round as one of 3 members) also hired George Bennett as principal and teacher. Round's parents and sister all moved to either to Manassas (where they were buried) or to Washington, D.C. (a short train ride away and from whose public schools the new Manassas public school bought some furnishings). In 1872, the new school board built the Ruffner building (named after Virginia's first superintendent of public instruction), which allowed the white school to leave the church. $300 of the money needed to construct a new building would come from the Peabody Education Fund, with the remaining $694.24 from local subscriptions as well as donations from other northerners; Quakers established the Brown school, a.k.a. Manassas Village Colored School in 1870 and by 1900 the village had six schools for white children and four for black children. As the town grew, Round would secure financing including from Andrew Carnegie for the Bennett building in 1909. Round also served on Manassas' first town council (1873), as the town clerk (from 1873 until 1873 (when he was replaced by Robert C. Weir, who had been the town's first mayor and would serve intermittently for decades in various offices), and on the school board (1870–1912). He also secured federal positions as postmaster, then as federal tax commissioner (1875–1881),

In 1874, Prince William County voters elected Round as their delegate to the Virginia General Assembly (a part-time position). He succeeded lifetime resident (and delegate to the Virginia Constitutional Convention of 1868 but single-term Delegate) Benjamin F. Lewis (1816–1878), son of William Montgomery Lewis (1793–1867). Although (or because) Round proposed legislation to establish teacher training colleges across Virginia, he was not re-elected. Confederate veteran and farmer James R. Purcell succeeded him (again for one term). Nonetheless, Round stayed in the area, and became a booster—planting shade trees along Manassas' streets, donating land to build the county courthouse in Manassas (after considerable controversy it moved for the fourth time westward, from centrally-located Brentsville, which lacked railroad access) and helped preserve historic Bel Air mansion. Round also donated land for sisters Fannie and Eugenia Osbourn to establish their higher school which became the Manassas Institute (the county's first high school) in 1906, two years before the state-mandated free public high school education. Round also helped Manassas host the 8th district teacher training college. It added courses in agriculture, domestic science, teacher training and even commerce in 1915 similar to those offered African American children at the private Manassas Industrial School for Colored Youth founded by Jennie Dean two decades earlier (on whose board Round also sat, and served as its legal advisor). The "Ruffner School and Manassas High School" Building would close in 1926, when overcrowding threatened its state accreditation so a new brick Osbourn High School was built and named after the early teachers. Round also served as president of the Virginia School Trustee Association in 1906, and helped establish an agricultural extension service for Prince William county. He also helped establish the local Manasseh Lodge of Masons in 1875, and served as its first secretary.

Round was also active in veterans' activities, with the U.S. Signal Association as well as groups to reconcile with former Confederates. In veterans activities, Round collaborated with former Confederate officer Edmund Berkeley (who represented Prince William as delegate in the Virginia General Assembly of 1891–1892) as well as Dr. Henry M. Clarkson and bankers Westwood Hutchison and G. Raymond Ratcliffe. Round spent years trying to create a national park around the monuments being erected on the Manassas battlefield, while maintaining much of the farmland in not only productive use, but for historical accuracy. Round helped secure U.S. Army maneuvers in the area in 1905, and also worked to re-enact both the First Battle of Manassas and Second Battle of Manassas, although both were Union defeats. Congressman John F. Rixey, a Virginia Confederate veteran, sponsored a bill to create a study commission concerning the battlefield park but died unexpectedly in 1907. Round and Berkeley then conceived and organized the Manassas Peace Jubilee, also known as the "Reunion of the Blue and the Gray," which culminated on June 21, 1911, with a gun-free battle re-enactment and speeches by U.S. President William Howard Taft and Virginia Governor (and Confederate veteran) William Hodges Mann. Rixey's successor Charles Carlin (son of a Confederate veteran) secured passage of the battlefield park investigative commission bill in 1912, but by the time the three commissioners recommended purchase, World War I had begun.

Death and legacy

Round died in his home in Manassas in 1918, survived by his wife, children and grandchildren. Rev. Alex. Stuart Gibson conducted his funeral at Trinity Episcopal Church (in which Round was active later in his life). Round was buried later that afternoon at Arlington National Cemetery, as would his grandson Brig. Gen. Roswell Emory Round Jr. in 2017. The Manassas Battlefield Park was created during the Great Depression by the National Park Service and the Works Progress Administration, and even larger than Round had hoped during his lifetime, including the most historic areas associated with both battles. The Manassas Museum has his papers. In 1986, the Manassas School Board built a new elementary school and named it to honor Round.

References

1839 births
1918 deaths
Virginia lawyers
19th-century American politicians
Members of the Virginia House of Delegates
People of Virginia in the American Civil War
People from Manassas, Virginia
Wesleyan University alumni
Columbia Law School alumni
19th-century American lawyers